Shivers is the second studio album by Dutch DJ and record producer Armin van Buuren. It was released on 8 August 2005 by Armada Music.

The title track of the album appeared on the home version of the music video game Dance Dance Revolution SuperNova in 2006.

In 2021, the song "Shivers" was voted by fans as the #1 song in the 20-year history of A State of Trance in episode #1000.

Track listing

Charts

References

External links
 Shivers at Discogs

2005 albums
Armin van Buuren albums
Armada Music albums